Seckman is an unincorporated community in Jefferson County, in the U.S. state of Missouri.

History
A post office called Seckman was established in 1889, and remained in operation until 1906. The community has the name of Henry Seckman, a local judge.

References

Unincorporated communities in Jefferson County, Missouri
Unincorporated communities in Missouri